Vännäsberget is a village situated in Överkalix Municipality, Norrbotten County, Sweden with 207 inhabitants in 2005.

References 

Populated places in Överkalix Municipality
Norrbotten